Richard Kaufman may refer to:

 Richard J. Kaufman (born 1958), author, publisher, illustrator and editor
 Richard S. Kaufman, American television producer
 Richard Kaufman (cricketer) (born 1980), English cricketer

See also
 Richard Kauffmann (1887–1958), German-Jewish architect
 Richard Kauffman (born 1955), the first New York State "energy czar"
 Dick Kauffman, baseball player